Rock'n Roll Holiday: Live in Atlanta was an early live show of Memphis-based garage punk rockers Oblivians, recorded in August 1994 in Atlanta, Georgia. The recording was originally issued in 1995 as a vinyl bootleg on Negro Records, of which 500 copies were produced. It was later re-released by Sympathy for the Record Industry in 2003 on both vinyl LP and CD.

Track listing
"Motorcycle Leather Boy" (Milan the Leather Boy) – 3:24
"Viet Nam War Blues" (Lightnin' Hopkins) – 3:01
"Jim Cole" – 1:17
"Feel Real Good" – 2:22
"Static Party" – 1:55
"And Then I Fucked Her" – 2:33
"Someday You'll Be Loved" – 3:04
"Love Killed My Brain" – 2:24
"No Reason to Live" – 1:42
"Plate in My Head" – 2:12
"Shut My Mouth" – 2:36
"Happy Blues" – 5:31
"Blew My Cool" – 2:14
"Shake Your Ass" – 3:38
"Nigger Rich" (Jack Oblivian/Richard Peeples) – 2:40
"Never Change" – 2:46

Credits 
 Eric Oblivian – Guitar, drums, vocals
 Greg Oblivian – Guitar, drums, vocals
 Jack Oblivian – Guitar, drums, vocals

Oblivians albums
1995 live albums